Love & Peace is the third Japanese studio album and seventh overall by South Korean girl group Girls' Generation. The album was released for digital download on December 10, 2013, in selected countries in Asia by Nayutawave Records (Universal Music Group), followed by a physical release in Japan the next day. This marks their last Japanese studio album featuring member Jessica before her departure from the group in 2014.

Three singles were released prior to the release of the album: "Love & Girls", peaking at number four on the Oricon Chart and at number three on the Japan Hot 100, "Galaxy Supernova", peaking at number three on Oricon as well as number four on the Japan Hot 100 chart and "My Oh My".  The album was certified Gold by the Recording Industry Association of Japan (RIAJ) less than a month after its release, for sales of 100,000.

Background and development
The album was physically released in four editions, with each edition containing the same twelve songs.
The four editions also feature three different album covers, with the Blu-ray limited edition and DVD limited edition sharing the same cover.

Release and promotion
On October 25, 2013, it was revealed that Girls' Generation will be releasing their third Japanese album on December 11. "Galaxy Supernova", "Love & Girls", "Do The Catwalk", "Lingua Franca",
"My Oh My" and "Beep Beep" (B-side from "Flower Power") have all been released prior to the release of this album.

A live show subsequently titled as Love & Peace took place on December 14, 2013, at the Yokohama Arena, with tickets distributed through a lottery available to those who purchased the third album.

The album was initially made available for pre-order on iTunes for Hong Kong, India, Sri Lanka, Taiwan, and most of Southeast Asia with "Motorcycle" becoming available for download immediately after purchase.

The album was promoted with the tour Girls' Generation Japan 3rd Tour 2014, started on April 26, 2014, in Marine Messe Fukuoka, Fukuoka, Japan. The tour was ended on July 13, 2014, in Yoyogi National Gymnasium, Tokyo, Japan.

Singles
"Love & Girls" served as the lead single from Love & Peace. It was released on June 19, 2013, in Japan by Nayutawave Records and Universal Music Japan. The single debuted at number 4 on the Japanese Oricon Singles Chart, selling 42,796 physical copies within its first week of release. It also peaked at number 3 on the Japan Hot 100.

"Galaxy Supernova" debuted at number four on the Oricon Daily Singles Chart.
The single managed to sell 14,564 physical copies on its second day achieving first place in the Oricon Daily Singles Chart.
One week after the release, Galaxy Supernova managed to sell 50,793 physical copies.

"My Oh My" was released digitally on November 5, 2013, as a promotional single. The music video depicts the girls dressed in brightly colored outfits, taking revenge on a guy who cheated on his girlfriend by using magic to teach him a lesson. The song "Motorcycle" was released as the second promotional single on December 5, 2013.

Reception

Love & Peace garnered mixed reviews from contemporary music critics.

On the day of its physical release, the album debuted on the daily Oricon Albums Chart at number one.
After the first week, with sales amounting to about 129,000, it debuted on the weekly Oricon chart at number one as well and number two on Billboard Japan, which resulted in the album being certified Gold by the Recording Industry Association of Japan (RIAJ).
Due to receiving significant airplay in Japan, "Motorcycle" charted on the Adult Contemporary Airplay chart of Billboard Japan at number 54, along with "Marry You" by Bruno Mars, "Best Song Ever" by One Direction, "Yuki no Hana" by Mika Nakashima, and eight other songs.

All of the album's tracks charted at various positions from number ten to 126 on the South Korean Gaon international Digital Chart following the release.  Love & Peace also debuted at number ten and peaked at number nine with Shíjiān de gē  (2013) by Cheer Chen and two other albums on the Taiwanese albums chart.  The album debuted on the monthly Oricon albums chart at number two.

Track listing

Charts and certifications

Weekly charts

Year-end charts

Certifications

Release history

References

External links

2013 albums
Girls' Generation albums
Universal Music Japan albums
SM Entertainment albums
Japanese-language albums